Dicranurus (Greek, 'dikranon', a pitchfork, and 'oura', tail) is a genus of Lower to Middle Devonian odontopleurid trilobites that lived in a shallow sea that lay between Euramerica and Gondwana, corresponding to modern-day Oklahoma and New York, and Morocco, respectively. As such, their fossils are found in New York, Oklahoma, and Morocco. It is speculated that such tremendous spines hampered the ability of predators, such as arthrodire placoderms, to attack them, as well as to help prevent them from sinking into the soft mud of their environment. Dicranurus trilobites are distinguished from other odontopleurids by the pair of large, curled, horn-like spines that emanate from behind the glabellum. The genus name refers to these distinctive horns, in fact.

In popular culture
Dicranurus was an inspiration for an early version of an alien creature from the 2012 movie Prometheus. While the final design doesn't look much like Dicranurus, the creature is still referred to as "trilobite" due to its inspiration.

External links
 Description of Haragan Formation, Oklahoma 
 Fossil Mall's description of D. elegans 
 Fossil Mall's description of D. hamatus 
 Fossil Museum's description of D. monstrosus

Sources

Odontopleuridae
Odontopleurida genera
Devonian trilobites of Africa
Devonian trilobites of North America